Chicago Heights is a city in Cook County, Illinois, United States. The population was 27,480 at the 2020 census. In earlier years, Chicago Heights was nicknamed "The Crossroads of the Nation". Currently, it is nicknamed "The Heights".

Geography
Chicago Heights lies on the high land of the Tinley Moraine, with the higher and older Valparaiso Moraine lying just to the south of the city.

The city's major crossroads are at Dixie Highway (Illinois Route 1) and Lincoln Highway (U.S. Route 30).

Demographics

As of the 2020 census there were 27,480 people, 9,736 households, and 6,708 families residing in the city. The racial makeup of the city was 42.50% African American, 21.05% White, 1.27% Native American, 0.30% Asian, 0.13% Pacific Islander, 23.35% from other races, and 11.41% from two or more races. Hispanic or Latino of any race were 38.99% of the population.

There were 9,736 households, out of which 69.71% had children under the age of 18 living with them, 37.53% were married couples living together, 20.75% had a female householder with no husband present, and 31.10% were non-families. 28.29% of all households were made up of individuals, and 14.07% had someone living alone who was 65 years of age or older. The average household size was 3.67 and the average family size was 2.96.

The city's age distribution consisted of 26.9% under the age of 18, 10.7% from 18 to 24, 24.2% from 25 to 44, 23.4% from 45 to 64, and 14.9% who were 65 years of age or older. The median age was 35.4 years. For every 100 females, there were 94.5 males. For every 100 females age 18 and over, there were 95.8 males.

The median income for a household in the city was $49,880, and the median income for a family was $59,536. Males had a median income of $35,142 versus $26,790 for females. The per capita income for the city was $21,948. About 18.6% of families and 24.3% of the population were below the poverty line, including 33.0% of those under age 18 and 22.7% of those age 65 or over.

Education

Schools
Chicago Heights School District 170 operates eleven schools, with a student population of 3,600. Highland is the district's pre-school for children aged three and four; Garfield, Grant, Greenbriar, Jefferson, Kennedy, Lincoln, Roosevelt, Washington-McKinley, and Wilson are neighborhood schools that serve students from kindergarten through eighth grade.

Chicago Heights is home to Bloom High School, which all students of District 170 attend after 8th grade, and Bloom Trail High School, which shares its athletic programs with Bloom. Many students from neighboring communities including Steger, South Chicago Heights, Ford Heights, Sauk Village and Glenwood attend high school at Bloom.

Parts of Chicago Heights are included in Flossmoor School District 161 which includes Serena Hills Elementary School in Chicago Heights. After Serena, students attend Parker Jr. High School—also a part of Flossmoor School District 161. Only some students who went to Parker Jr. High School move on to Homewood-Flossmoor High School; the rest attend Bloom High School. 

Parts of Chicago Heights are also served by Park Forest – Chicago Heights School District 163, and Beacon Hill Primary Center is located in the Beacon Hill neighborhood.  Students from this neighborhood attend Rich East High School, part of Rich Township High School District 227.

Marian Catholic High School, affiliated with the Roman Catholic Archdiocese of Chicago, is a private high school located in city.

Prairie State College is a community college located in Chicago Heights.

There are also many elementary schools that operate at church locations.

Public library
On May 20, 1901, many Chicago Heights residents signed a petition asking for the mayor and aldermen to select a board of directors that would be responsible for founding and running a free public library in Chicago Heights. On June 28, 1901, the first library board members were sworn in, including Sam W. Lea, F.W. Schact, W.E. Canady, James Bowie, David Wallace, Joseph Caldwell, C.W. Salisbury, A.J. Sorensen, and A.W. McEldowney. The library was opened in a small room in the new city building on February 20, 1902. That month, the library board wrote to industrialist Andrew Carnegie seeking funds to build a library building in Chicago Heights. In July, the board was notified that Carnegie had proposed $15,000 toward the cost of a library building as long as the city could provide a free site for the building and if the council could promise $1,500 a year to keep the library running. The Carnegie Library in Chicago Heights was designed by Richard E. Schmidt. The library was located at 1627 Halsted Street and opened on September 11, 1903, with a staff of two and 1,643 volumes. A bigger library was eventually needed, and on August 5, 1972, the present building at 15th Street and Chicago Road was opened. The Chicago Heights Free Public Library was a million-dollar building that opened with 60,000 books, records, and other materials.

Economy 
Chicago Heights was once home to a number of major industrial concerns, including the Thrall Car Manufacturing Company, manufacturer of freight cars, run for many years by chief executive officer Richard L. Duchossois. The city was also the original home of the Inland Steel Company.

Ford Motor Company operates a metal stamping plant located along Lincoln Highway in Chicago Heights.

Infrastructure

Transportation

Chicago Heights is served by six Pace bus routes and the Pace Chicago Heights Terminal.

Healthcare
There was a Well Group Clinic (part of St. James) located on Dixie Highway. Well Group was previously known as Suburban Heights Medical Center. There are also two Aunt Martha's health centers in Chicago Heights.

In September 2018, St. James Hospital closed after more than 100 years.

Notable people 

 Paris Barclay, television producer and director, Sons of Anarchy; president of Directors Guild of America
 Jim Bouton, pitcher for New York Yankees, Seattle Pilots, Houston Astros, and Atlanta Braves; pitched in 1963 and 1964 World Series; author of Ball Four
 David Broder, Pulitzer Prize-winning political columnist (The Washington Post)
 Don Brumm, defensive lineman with NFL's St. Louis Cardinals and Philadelphia Eagles
 Luke Butkus, lineman and coach for University of Illinois; assistant coach Seattle Seahawks, Jacksonville Jaguars
 Jerry Colangelo, chairman of USA Basketball, owned Phoenix Suns and Arizona Diamondbacks, chairman of NBA's Philadelphia 76ers, 2007 inductee in Basketball Hall of Fame
 Eddie Condon, jazz musician
 Darlene Conley, actress, portrayed Sally Spectra from 1988 to 2007 on The Bold and the Beautiful
 Aldo DeAngelis, Illinois state senator and businessman
 Jon Debus, Major League Baseball coach
 Anthony DeLuca, mayor, state representative
 Mike Downey, sports columnist with Los Angeles Times and Chicago Tribune
 Rube Ehrhardt, MLB pitcher for Brooklyn Robins and Cincinnati Reds
 Tom Erikson, amateur wrestler and mixed martial artist
 Joe Farrell, jazz saxophonist
 Wally Flager, shortstop for Cincinnati Reds and Philadelphia Phillies
 Matt Fraction, writer for Marvel Comics
 Joe Gentile, author and publisher
 Phil Guy, blues guitarist
 Debbie Halvorson, U.S. Representative, 2009–11
 Robert P. Hanrahan, U.S. Representative, 1973–75
 Rodney Harrison, safety for San Diego Chargers and New England Patriots, two-time Super Bowl champion; NFL television analyst
 John Holecek, linebacker for NFL's Buffalo Bills
 Irene Hughes, psychic, television personality
 Leroy Jackson, 3-time 100 yard dash state champion 1956–58, Washington Redskins running back
 Jan Johnson, pole vaulter, 3-time NCAA champion, bronze medalist at 1972 Summer Olympics in Munich
 Nancy Kaszak, state representative
 Dennis Kelly, offensive tackle with NFL's Philadelphia Eagles and Tennessee Titans
 Tim Kelly, assistant coach, Houston Texans and Tennessee Titans
 Todd Krygier, left wing for NHL's Hartford Whalers, Washington Capitals and Anaheim Ducks
 Carol Mann, Hall of Fame golfer on LPGA tour
 Audie Matthews, captain of University of Illinois basketball team, 1976–78
 Ernie McMillan, 15-year offensive lineman for NFL's St. Louis Cardinals
 Johnny Mince, clarinetist, played with Glenn Miller, Tommy Dorsey and other big bands
 John Mosca, decorated US Army soldier; restaurateur of Mosca's in Louisiana
 Michael O'Hare, actor
 Charles Panici, city's mayor, imprisoned 1993-2001
 Johnny Pate, jazz musician and music producer
 Ted Pawelek, catcher for Chicago Cubs
 Mark Pfeil, pro golfer
 Bret Prinz, pitcher for Arizona Diamondbacks, New York Yankees, Los Angeles Angels, and Chicago White Sox
 Mike Prior, defensive back for Tampa Bay Buccaneers, Indianapolis Colts, and Green Bay Packers, NFL champion (Super Bowl XXXI)
 Shonda Rhimes, television creator, writer and producer, Scandal, Grey's Anatomy, How to Get Away with Murder
 Maurino Richton, lawyer, Illinois, state representative, and mayor of Chicago Heights
 Andy Rosenband, professional soccer player. He was raised in Chicago Heights.
 Bret Saberhagen, pitcher for Kansas City Royals, New York Mets, Colorado Rockies, and Boston Red Sox; 1985 World Series champion and Cy Young Award winner
 Olayinka Sanni, basketball player for WNBA's Phoenix Mercury
 Allen R. Schindler Jr., murdered U.S. sailor
 John F. Stossel, consumer reporter with Fox News, investigative journalist
 Brian Timpone, conservative businessman, former TV reporter (KDLH CBS 3) and media entrepreneur
 Ted Uhlaender, outfielder for Minnesota Twins, Cleveland Indians, and Cincinnati Reds
 Tyler Ulis, basketball player for Kentucky and NBA's Phoenix Suns
 Derrick Walker, tight end for San Diego Chargers, Oakland Raiders, and Kansas City Chiefs
 Lloyd Walton, point guard for Marquette and the Milwaukee Bucks
 Tom Wieghaus, catcher for Houston Astros and Montreal Expos
 Oscar Lawton Wilkerson, pilot
 Julian Wright, small forward for Kansas, two NBA teams, and several European teams
 Anna Irwin Young, mathematician was born here
 Bryant Young, 4-time All-Pro defensive tackle for San Francisco 49ers and Super Bowl XXIX champion; Pro Football Hall of Fame
 Walter Young, wide receiver for Pittsburgh Steelers
 Bart Zeller, catcher for St. Louis Cardinals, minor-league manager and coach

Sister Cities
Chicago Heights has 4 sister cities.:
Asuogyaman District, Ghana
Cedral, San Luis Potosí, Mexico
Wadowice, Lesser Poland Voivodeship, Poland
San Benedetto del Tronto, Ascoli Piceno, Marche, Italy

References

 Kenneth J. Schoon, Calumet Beginnings, 2003, p. 115–117

External links

 City of Chicago Heights official website

 
Cities in Illinois
Chicago metropolitan area
Cities in Cook County, Illinois
Populated places established in 1833
Populated places on the Underground Railroad
1893 establishments in Illinois
Majority-minority cities and towns in Cook County, Illinois